St. Clare's Church, St. Clare Church, Saint Clare's Church, Church of St Clare or other variations on the name, may refer to:

Cuba 
 Catedral de Santa Clara de Asís (Cathedral of Saint Clare of Assisi), in Santa Clara

India 
 St Clara's Church (Assonora)

Paraguay 
 St. Claire Cathedral, Villarrica

Poland 
 Chapel of the Sisters of the Poor Clares, Bydgoszcz
 Poor Clares' Church, Bydgoszcz

Portugal 
 Igreja de Santa Clara (Porto) (Church of Saint Clare)
 Igreja de Santa Clara (Santarém) (Church of Saint Clare)

Sweden 
 Klara Church, Stockholm

Ukraine 
 Church of St. Clare, Horodkivka

United Kingdom 
St Clare's Church, Liverpool
St Clare of Assisi, Middlesbrough

United States 
Saint Clare Parish, in Santa Clara, California
St. Clare Church (Manhattan), New York
St. Clare of Assisi's Church (Bronx), New York
St. Clare's Church (Staten Island, New York)

Uruguay 
 San Antonio y Santa Clara, Montevideo (Church of Saint Anthony and Saint Clare)

See also 
 Santa Chiara (disambiguation), including a list of namesake churches in Italy